Hugo Santos may refer to:

 Hugo Santos (footballer, born 1972), Portuguese football player
 Hugo Santos (footballer, born 1978), Portuguese football player
 Hugo Santos (footballer, born 1983), Portuguese football player